Jessica Walter was an American actress known for film, television and theatre.

Filmography

Film

Television

Theater

References 

Actress filmographies
American filmographies